Schumannianthus is a group of plants in the Marantaceae described as a genus in 1904.

Schumannianthus dichotomus is cultivated in riverine areas of South Asia and Southeast Asia for making Shital pati, mats that feel cool to the touch, for use on floors and beds.

 Species
 Schumannianthus dichotomus (Roxb.) Gagnep. - E Himalayas, Indochina, P Malaysia, Borneo, Philippines
 Schumannianthus monophyllus Suksathan, Borchs. & A.D.Poulsen - Sarawak

References

Marantaceae
Zingiberales genera